The North City was an administrative area in the ancient Egyptian city of Amarna in Upper Egypt, the short-lived capital of Pharaoh Akhenaten of the 18th Dynasty. It contains the ruins of royal palaces, especially the Northern Palace and other administrative buildings and occupies an area between the river and the cliffs that terminate the plains to the north of the city itself.

Akhetaten was the capital city of the 18th-dynasty king, Akhenaten, called by some ‘the heretic king’. Akhenaten, formerly Amenhotep IV, built his city in a bay of cliffs on the east bank of the Nile as a centre for the worship of his ‘new’ religion, Atenism. The archaeology of the city is defined by low excavated or reconstructed walls and in some cases only bare outlines of the structures can be made out on the sand-covered plain, since most of the stonework was removed in ancient times and any remaining mudbrick is badly decayed. Only one generation after Akhenaten's death, there were few physical remains of his superb innovative structures, for a short moment in history one of the greatest cities of ancient Egypt.

The brief Amarna Period was a period of startling artistic and cultural breakthroughs. Amenhotep IV came to the throne about 1350 B.C. and redirected the state religion to the worship of one god, the sun god Aten, and suppressed the worship of others. Some have called him the world's first monotheist. Amenhotep IV changed his name to Akhenaten ("One Who Serves Aten") and moved his capital from Thebes down the Nile to an area he named Akhetaten ("Horizon of the Sun-Disk"), today known as Amarna. It was previously unoccupied and thus was a blank page upon which the pharaoh could write his new history of the world. Despite his radical beliefs (monotheism), Akhenaten did not abandon all tradition, and he apparently prepared a royal tomb for himself and his family in the cliffs of Amarna. His mummy is yet to be found.

References

Amarna